God Created Them (Spanish: Dios los cría) is a 1953 Mexican comedy film directed by Gilberto Martínez Solares and starring Germán Valdés, Niní Marshall and Marcelo Chávez.

Cast
 Germán Valdés as Tin Tan 
 Niní Marshall as Nínive Canovas Canesi  
 Marcelo Chávez as Licenciado Trinquete  
 José René Ruiz as Tun Tun  
 Celia Viveros as Lupe  
 Juan García as  de licenciado  
 Ramón Valdés as Ramón; Otto 
 Rafael Estrada as Representante de agencia  
 Elvira Lodi as Invitada a fiesta 
 Armando Acosta as Transeúnte estación tren  
 Daniel Arroyo as Miembro comité asilo  
 Victorio Blanco as Espectador asamblea  
 Carlos Bravo y Fernández as Representante agencia  
 Jorge Chesterking as Hombre con trofeo  
 Ismael Larumbe as Empleado hotel 
 Gloria Mestre
 Kika Meyer as Clienta salón de belleza
 José Ortega as Chofer de Otto  
 José Ortiz de Zárate as Carlos Fernández Taboada  
 Yolanda Ortiz as Empleada salón de belleza  
 Carlos Robles Gil as Invitado a fiesta  
 María Valdealde as Doña Carolina Montero de Campaña  
 Hernán Vera as Anunciador en asamblea

References

Bibliography 
 María Luisa Amador. Cartelera cinematográfica, 1950-1959. UNAM, 1985.

External links 
 

1953 films
1953 comedy films
Mexican comedy films
1950s Spanish-language films
Films directed by Gilberto Martínez Solares
Mexican black-and-white films
1950s Mexican films